The cat o' nine tails, commonly shortened to the cat, is a type of multi-tailed whip or flail that originated as an implement for severe physical punishment, notably in the Royal Navy and British Army, and as a judicial punishment in Britain and some other countries.

Etymology
The term first appears in 1681 in reports of a London murder. The term came into wider circulation in 1695 after its mention by a character in William Congreve's play Love for Love, although the design is much older. It was probably so called in reference to its "claws", which inflict parallel wounds. There are equivalent terms in many languages, usually strictly translating, and also some analogous terms referring to a similar instrument's number of tails (cord or leather), such as the Dutch zevenstaart (seven tail[s]), negenstaart (nine tail[s]), the Spanish gato de nueve colas or the Italian gatto a nove code.

Description

It traditionally has nine thongs as a result of the manner in which rope is plaited. Thinner rope is made from three strands of yarn plaited together, and thicker rope from three strands of thinner rope plaited together. To make a cat o' nine tails, a rope is unraveled into three small ropes, each of which is unraveled again. 

The 19th-century British naval cat was made out of a piece of rope, thicker than a man's wrist (about ),  in length. The first  were stiff and solid stuff, and the remaining  unraveled into hard twisted and knotted ends.

Variations
Variations exist, either named cat (of x tails) or not, such as the whip used on adult Egyptian prisoners which had a cord on a cudgel branching into seven tails, each with six knots, used only on adult men, with boys being subject to caning, until Egypt banned the use of the device in 2001.

Sometimes the term "cat" is used incorrectly to describe various other punitive flogging devices with multiple tails in any number, even one made from 80 twigs (so rather a limp birch) to flog a drunk or other offender instead of 80 lashes normally applicable under shariah law. The closed cat, one without tails, was called a starter.

Historical punishments

Naval types and use
Formal floggings — those ordered by captain or court martial — were administered ceremonially on deck, the crew being summoned to "witness punishment" and the prisoner being brought forward by marines with fixed bayonets.

In the British navy, the boatswain's mate stood two steps from the offender, combing out the tails of the cat due to the thinner parts of the cat sticking to each other. He would then swing it over his head, make a step forward and, bending his body to give more force to the blow, deliver the stroke at the full sweep of his arm.

Drunkenness could be punished by a dozen lashes, which could be administered on the authority of the ship's captain. Greater punishments were generally administered following a formal court martial, with Royal Navy records reflecting some standard penalties of two hundred lashes for desertion, three hundred for mutiny, and up to five hundred for theft. The offence of sodomy generally drew the death penalty, though one eighteenth century court martial awarded a punishment of one thousand lashesa roughly equivalent sentence as there was no likelihood of survival.

A new cat was made for each flogging by a bosun's mate and kept in a red baize bag until use. If several dozen lashes were awarded, each could be administered by a fresh bosun's mate—some ships captains would include a left-handed bosun's mate in their crews, so that one could be included to assure extra painful crisscrossing of the wounds. One dozen was usually awarded as a highly sensitizing prelude to running the gauntlet.

For summary punishment of Royal Navy boys, a lighter model was made, the reduced cat, also known as boy's cat, boy's pussy or just pussy , that had only five tails of smooth whip cord. If formally convicted by a court martial, however, even boys would suffer the punishment of the adult cat. While adult sailors received their lashes on the back, they were administered to boys on the bare posterior, usually while "kissing the gunner's daughter" (publicly bending over a gun barrel), just as boys' lighter "daily" chastisement was usually over their (often naked) rear-end (mainly with a cane—this could be applied to the hand, but captains generally refused such impractical disablement—or a rope's end). Bare-bottom discipline was a tradition of the English upper and middle classes, who frequented public schools, so midshipmen (trainee officers, usually from 'good families', getting a cheaper equivalent education by enlisting) were not spared. Still, it is reported that the 'infantile' embarrassment of prolonged, public bare-bottom punishment was believed essential for optimal deterrence; cocky miscreants might brave the pain of the adult cat in the macho spirit of "taking it like a man" or even as a "badge of honour".

On board training ships, where most of the crew were boys, the cat was never introduced, but their bare bottoms risked, as in other naval establishments on land, "the sting of the birch", another favourite in public schools.

Flogging round the fleet
"The severest form of flogging was a flogging round the fleet. The number of lashes was divided by the number of ships in port and the offender was rowed between ships for each ship's company to witness the punishment." Penalties of hundreds of lashes were imposed for the gravest offences, including sedition and mutiny. The prisoner was rowed around the fleet in an open boat and received a number of his lashes at each ship in turn, for as long as the surgeon allowed. Sentences often took months or years to complete, depending on how much a man was expected to bear at a time. Normally 250–500 lashes would kill a man, as infections would spread. After the flogging was completed, the sailor's lacerated back was frequently rinsed with brine or seawater, which was thought to serve as a crude antiseptic (although it is now known that seawater contains significant microbial components). Although the purpose was to control infection, it caused the sailor to endure additional pain, and gave rise to the expression "rubbing salt into his wounds", which came to mean vindictively or gratuitously increasing a punishment or injury already imposed.

British Army
The British Army had a similar multiple whip, though much lighter in construction, made of a drumstick with attached strings. The flogger was usually a drummer rather than a strong bosun's mate. Flogging with the cat o' nine tails fell into disuse around 1870.

Whereas the British naval cat rarely cut (contrary to graphic films) but rather abraded the skin, the falls (tresses) of the British Army cat were lighter (around ) and the string was in fact codlinea very dense material akin to tarred string. Although the total whip would weigh only a fraction of a naval rope cat, the thin, dense codline tresses were far more likely to cut the skin. However, one lash in the navy was considered equivalent in severity to several in the army; and although the lashes were numbered by dozens instead of hundreds, twelve stripes afloat were fully equal to a hundred on shore. This was partly owing to the make and material of the cat, and also to the mode of flogging.

It was also used elsewhere in the empire, notably at the penal colonies in Australia, and also in Canada (a dominion in 1867) where it was used until 1881. An 1812 drawing shows a drummer apparently lashing the buttocks of a naked soldier who is tied with spread legs on an A-frame made from sergeants' half pikes. In many places, soldiers were generally flogged stripped to the waist.

Prison usage
The cat o' nine tails was also used on adult convicts in prisons; a 1951 memorandum (possibly confirming earlier practice) ordered all UK male prisons to use only cats o' nine tails (and birches) from a national stock at Wandsworth prison, where they were to be 'thoroughly' tested before being supplied in triplicate to a prison whenever a flogging was pending for use as prison discipline. In the 20th century, this use was confined to very serious cases involving violence against a prison officer, and each flogging had to be confirmed by central government.

Penal colonies in Australia
Especially harsh floggings were given with it in secondary penal colonies of early colonial Australia, particularly at such places as Norfolk Island (apparently this had 9 leather thongs, each with a lead weight, meant as the ultimate deterrent for hardened life-convicts), Port Arthur and Moreton Bay (now Brisbane).

Modern uses and types

Judicial corporal punishment was removed from the statute book in Great Britain in 1948. The cat was still being used in Australia in 1957 and is still in use in a few Commonwealth countries, although the cane is used in more countries.

Judicial corporal punishment has been abolished or declared unconstitutional since 1997 in Jamaica, St. Vincent and the Grenadines, South Africa, Zambia, Uganda (in 2001) and Fiji (in 2002).

However, some former colonies in the Caribbean have reinstated flogging with the cat. Antigua and Barbuda reinstated it in 1990, followed by the Bahamas in 1991 (where, however, it was subsequently banned by law) and Barbados in 1993 (only to be formally declared inhumane and thus unconstitutional by the Barbados Supreme Court).

Trinidad and Tobago never banned the "cat".  Under the Corporal Punishment (Offenders over Sixteen) Act 1953, use of the "cat" was limited to male offenders over the age of 16. The age limit was raised in 2000 to 18.

The Government of Trinidad and Tobago has been accused of torture and "cruel, inhuman and degrading" treatment of prisoners, and in 2005 was ordered by the Inter-American Court of Human Rights to pay US$50,000 for "moral damages" to a prisoner who had received 15 strokes of the "cat" plus expenses for his medical and psychological care; it is unclear whether the Court's decisions were implemented. Trinidad and Tobago did not acknowledge the Court's jurisdiction, since it had denounced the American Convention on Human Rights several years before the Court started hearing this case.

See also
Cattail plant
BDSM
Flagellation
Scourge
Tawse
Whip

References

Further reading

William Congreve's Love for Love and the first mention of cat of nine tails in literature see page 32 and the fourth dialogue down spoken by Ben
CORporalPUNishment website – here an illustrated example among many other articles, mainly on the adult cat
EtymologyOnLine
Joseph W. Bean, Flogging, Greenery Press, 2000. .
Inter-American Court of Human Rights orders Trinidad to pay compensation for flogging and humiliation of prisoners in March 2005
Amnesty International report on use of the Cat o' nine tails on 6 Oct. 2006 in Bahamas 
Amnesty International report recording use of Cat o' nine tails on woman and young boy in Trinidad 
Inter-American Court of Human Rights' decisions and documents
External links

 Pictures of cat o'nine tails in the UK Royal Navy

17th-century neologisms
Whips
Corporal punishments
English inventions